Judaai    is a 2015 Pakistani drama serial broadcast on Geo Entertainment, directed by Syed Ramish Rizvi, produced by Asif Raza Mir and Babar Javed and written by Amaya Khan. It stars Moammar Rana, Sabreen Hisbani and Shamoon Abbasi.

Synopsis 
Drama serial Judaai highlights the issue of divorce and how its ramifications effects the children. The serial narrates the stories of two couples; Khawar (Moammar Rana) and Aneeqa (Sabreen Hisbani) and Ijaz (Shamoon Abbasi) and Sarawat (Ayesha Toor). Story begins when Aneeqa begins to suspect her husband Khawar for having extra-marital affair. Lack of trust and affection between the two have a devastating effect on their children which goes on to haunt them later on in their life. On the other hand, Ijaz and Sarwat have a daughter together however due to their business commitment both of them fail to realize their responsibilities as parents. Will Ijaz and Sarwat ever be able to give her daughter the love and care that she deserves? Amidst the carelessness portrayed by the parents, will the children be able to recover from their childhood trauma or will they continue to suffer under their parents? Judaai revolves around the themes of pain, suffering and abandonment while living in toxic relationships.

Cast
Moammar Rana as Khawar
Sabreen Hisbani as Aneeqa
Shamoon Abbasi as Ejaz
Waseem Abbas
Ayesha Toor as Sarwat
Ghana Ali as Hamna
Kanwar Arsalan
Farah Nadir
Muneeb Butt as Hassam
Noor Khan as Suhaima
Hina Altaf as Amariya
Syed Hassan Ali

Soundtrack 
Drama serial Judaai original soundtrack has been performed by Ovais Niazi and composed by Ahsan Ali Taj while the lyrics are penned down by Sabir Zafar.

References

 Geo TV original programming
2015 Pakistani television series debuts
2015 Pakistani television series endings
Urdu-language television shows
Pakistani drama television series